Viuda alegre (English: Happy Widow) is a Chilean telenovela released on March 10 of 2008. It is written by Alejandro Cabrera, Guillermo Valenzuela, Trinidad Jiménez, Valeria Vargas and Nelson Pedreros, and directed by Vicente Sabatini.

Publicity for the series began on January 16 of that year. Two days later, a music video of the show's theme song Me Enamora was released.

Cast
Claudia Di Girólamo - Beatriz Sarmiento
Alfredo Castro - José Pablo Zulueta
Marcelo Alonso - Rodrigo Zulueta
Amparo Noguera - Kathy Meneses
Paz Bascuñán - Sofía Valdevenito Sarmiento
Francisco Reyes - Simón Díaz/Santiago Balmaceda
Francisca Lewin - Sabina Díaz/Javiera Balmaceda
Ricardo Fernández - Franco Fonseca Sarmiento
Alvaro Morales - Yagán Vivanco
Adela Secall - Paola Zulueta
Esperanza Silva - Teresita
Luis Alarcón - Edgardo Mancilla
Delfina Guzmán - Norita Norambuena
Rodrigo Pérez - Hermógenes León
Maria Jose Necochea - Susana Pizarro
Luis Eduardo Campos - Pedrito Pizarro
Roxana Campos - Adela Velásquez
Néstor Cantillana - Andrés Tapìa
Daniela Lhorente - Milenka Vivanco
Mauricio Pesutic - Sandro Zapata
Taira Court - Emilia Recart
Alvaro Espinoza - Alexis "Chaleco" Opazo
Begoña Basauri - Carolina Zapata
Oscar Hernández - Ramiro Opazo
Santiago Tupper - Marcos Hess
Verónica Soffia - Lupe Ossandón
José Sosa - Cóndor Dionisio Vivanco

Competence
Don Amor - Canal 13
Mala Conducta - Chilevisión

External links
Official web site

2008 telenovelas
2008 Chilean television series debuts
2008 Chilean television series endings
Chilean telenovelas
Televisión Nacional de Chile telenovelas
Spanish-language telenovelas